The 2011 European Rallycross Championship was the thirty fifth season of the FIA European Championships for Rallycross Drivers. The season consisted of ten rounds and started on 24 April with the British round at Lydden Hill Race Circuit. The season ended on 2 October, at Czech Republic at Sosnová.

Calendar

Championship standings
 For the drivers' championship, only the best four results from the first five rounds and the best four results from the remaining five rounds could be retained by each driver.  Points are awarded on a 20–17–15–13–12–11–10–9–8–7-6-5-4-3-2-1 scale for first 15 drivers.

Supercar

Super1600

TouringCar

References

External links
 

European Rallycross Championship
European Rallycross Championship
European Rallycross Championship seasons